Zongo may refer to:

Places
Zongo, Sud-Ubangi (DR Congo), a town in Democratic Republic of the Congo
Zongo, Kongo Central DRC, a town in Kongo Central, Democratic Republic of the Congo; see Congo River
Zongo (crater), an impact crater in the Argyre quadrangle of Mars

People
 Zongo (surname)

Other
Zongo, a character in the comic series Dungeon
Zongo Comics, a comic book publishing company founded by Matt Groening
Zongo Junction, an American instrumental Afrobeat band
Zongo River, a river in the La Paz Department of Bolivia
Zongo settlements, areas in West African towns populated mostly by settlers from Northern Sahel areas

See also
Zango (disambiguation)